South Coast Highway is a Western Australian highway. It is a part of the Highway 1 network.

Even then the journey is pretty much inland.

Approximately  from Ravensthorpe lies the Fitzgerald River National Park with beaches, coastal and mountain walking trails and wildflowers. There are three more national parks with abundant wildlife along the journey to Walpole. Albany is a former whaling town and is rich in history.

Beyond Walpole, Highway 1 continues as South Western Highway to Perth. Beyond Esperance, Highway 1 continues as Coolgardie–Esperance Highway to Norseman.

Towns
The highway passes through the following towns from East to West:
 Esperance
 Ravensthorpe
 Boxwood Hill
 Manypeaks
 Albany
 Denmark
 Walpole

See also

 Highways in Australia
 List of highways in Western Australia

References

External links

Highways in rural Western Australia
South coast of Western Australia
Highway 1 (Australia)